My Sister's Room (MSR) is a lesbian bar in Atlanta, Georgia. It is one of the few remaining lesbian bars in the nation. It was opened in 1996 by Susan Musselwhite and has been lesbian-owned and operated bar since 1996. Pictures of My Sister's Room in the 1990s are in Emory University's permanent photo collection.

MSR originally was located in the Midtown area of Atlanta. It then moved to the popular lesbian Atlanta suburb Decatur, Georgia from 1997-2006 until the building was sold to build condos and they moved to the bar district of East Atlanta Village.  In 2011 the bar was sold to Jen-Chase Daniels and Jami Siden. In the summer of 2015, My Sister's Room moved back to a larger space in the most LGBT-friendly part of Midtown Atlanta, also referred to as the "gayborhood".  It is currently a two-story dance venue.

MSR established the Pensacola Memorial Weekend Pride event "Sexacola" that caters to lesbian party goers.

References

External links 
 

1996 establishments in Georgia (U.S. state)
Bars (establishments)
Buildings and structures in Atlanta
Drinking establishments in Georgia (U.S. state)
Lesbian culture in the United States
Lesbian history
LGBT culture in Atlanta
LGBT drinking establishments in the United States
Women in Georgia (U.S. state)